The Year's Best Science Fiction: Twelfth Annual Collection is a science fiction anthology edited by Gardner Dozois that was published in 1995.  It is the 12th in The Year's Best Science Fiction series and won the Locus Award for best anthology.

Contents

The book includes a 50-page summation by Dozois; 23 stories, all that first appeared in 1994, and each with a two-paragraph introduction by Dozois; and a referenced list of honorable mentions for the year. The stories are as follows.

Ursula K. Le Guin: "Forgiveness Day"
Robert Reed: "The Remoras"
Maureen F. McHugh: "Nekropolis"
Nancy Kress: "Margin of Error"
Stephen Baxter: "Cilia-of-gold"
William Sanders: "Going After Old Man Alabama"
Michael F. Flynn: "Melodies of the Heart"
Terry Bisson: "The Hole in the Hole"
Pat Cadigan: "Paris In June"
George Turner:"Flowering Mandrake"
Joe Haldeman: "None So Blind," won the 1995 Hugo Award for Best Short Story
Greg Egan: "Cocoon"
Mike Resnick: "Seven Views of Olduvai Gorge," won the 1995 Hugo Award for Best Novella
Geoff Ryman: "Dead Space for the Unexpected"
Michael Bishop:"Cri de Coeur"
Howard Waldrop: "The Sawing Boys"
Ursula K. Le Guin: "The Matter of Seggri"
Eliot Fintushel: "Ylem"
Katharine Kerr: "Asylum"
Walter Jon Williams: "Red Elvis"
Mary Rosenblum: "California Dreamer"
Lisa Goldstein: "Split Light"
Brian Stableford: "Les Fleurs du Mal"

References

External links
Story synapses by Brian Davies (scroll down)

1995 anthologies
12
St. Martin's Press books